Ronald Steven Latz (born August 9, 1963) is an American attorney and politician serving as a member of the Minnesota Senate. A member of the Minnesota Democratic–Farmer–Labor Party (DFL), he represents District 46, which includes parts of Hennepin County in the western Twin Cities metropolitan area. He is an attorney by profession.

Early life and education
Latz attended Golden Valley High School in Golden Valley and Lindberg High School in Hopkins, graduating in 1981. He earned a Bachelor of Arts degree in political science from the University of Wisconsin–Madison and a Juris Doctor from Harvard Law School.

Career 
Latz was a Minnesota assistant attorney general for the Public Safety and Human Services Division under Attorney General Hubert Humphrey III from 1989 to 1995, then became a partner in the St. Louis Park law firm of Latz and Latz.

Latz has been active on various government and community councils and boards. He was a member of the St. Louis Park City Council from 1994 to 2003, also serving as mayor pro tem from 1999 to 2003. He is a former member of the Minnesota Attorney General's task forces on Health Care and Privacy. He is also a former state advocacy chair of the American Cancer Society, a former member of the Anti-Defamation League's Civil Rights and Education committees, and a former member of the Metropolitan Interfaith Council on Affordable Housing.

Minnesota legislature
Latz was first elected to the Senate in 2006, and reelected in 2010, 2012, 2016, and 2020.

Before being elected to the Senate, Latz was a member of the Minnesota House of Representatives, representing District 44B (before the 2002 legislative redistricting, the area was District 44A). He was first elected to the House in 2002, and reelected in 2004. In the House, he served on the Capital Investment, Civil Law, Education Policy and Reform, and Higher Education Finance committees. His father, Robert Latz, also served in the House, representing the old districts 35 and 39 from 1959 to 1967.

He served as a majority whip from 2007 to 2011.

Latz is serving on the following committees for the 2021–22 legislative biennium:

 Civil Law and Data Practices Policy
 Ranking Minority Chair of Judiciary and Public Safety Finance and Policy

His special legislative concerns are criminal and civil justice, consumer protection, and education.

Personal life
His father Bob Latz also served in the Minnesota Legislature. He is Jewish.

References

External links

Senator Ron Latz official Minnesota Senate website
Minnesota Public Radio Votetracker: Senator Ron Latz
Project Vote Smart - Senator Ron Latz Profile
Senator Ron Latz official campaign website

1963 births
Living people
Lawyers from Minneapolis
Politicians from Minneapolis
Democratic Party members of the Minnesota House of Representatives
Democratic Party Minnesota state senators
University of Wisconsin–Madison College of Letters and Science alumni
Harvard Law School alumni
People from St. Louis Park, Minnesota
20th-century American Jews
21st-century American politicians
21st-century American Jews
Jewish American state legislators in Minnesota